Abronia antauges (Mount Orizaba alligator lizard) is a species of lizard in the family Anguidae. The species is endemic to Veracruz, Mexico.

References

antauges
Endemic reptiles of Mexico
Reptiles described in 1866
Taxa named by Edward Drinker Cope